Protosquillidae is a family of mantis shrimp. It contains the following genera:
Chorisquilla Manning, 1969
Echinosquilla Manning, 1969
Haptosquilla Manning, 1969
Protosquilla Brooks, 1886
Rayellus Ahyong, 2010
Siamosquilla Naiyanetr, 1989

References

Stomatopoda
Crustacean families